Liu Jiang (born April 1940) is a retired Chinese politician who served as Minister of Agriculture between 1993 and 1998.

Liu was a member of the 15th CPC Central Committee and 16th Committee of the Central Commission for Discipline Inspection. He was also a member of the 10th National Committee of the Chinese People's Political Consultative Conference and a member of the 11th Standing Committee of the Chinese People's Political Consultative Conference.

Biography
Liu was born in Beijing in April 1940. In December 1964 he graduated from the College of Agriculture in Xinjiang Production and Construction Corps (now Shihezi University), where he majored in animal husbandry. After gradation, he was assigned to Tibet Military District, where he worked until August 1972.

In August 1972, Liu became a technician at Beijing Municipal Animal Husbandry and Veterinary Station, five years later he was promoted to become its deputy director.

Liu was the head of Beijing Red Star Chicken Farm in December 1979, and held that office until July 1982.

In 1982 he was promoted to become director of the Bureau of Animal Industry in Beijing, a position he held until 1986.

In January 1986, he was appointed vice-minister of Agriculture of the People's Republic of China, he remained in that position until November 1990, when he appointed deputy director of the State Planning Commission.

He rose to become minister of Agriculture of the People's Republic of China in March 1993, and served until March 1998.  

He served as deputy director the National Development and Reform Commission from March 1998 to March 2003, and again from March 2003 to August 2005.

In February 2005 he was appointed deputy director of the Committee for Ethnic and Religious Affairs, an institution under the jurisdiction of the Chinese People's Political Consultative Conference.

References

1940 births
Living people
Central Party School of the Chinese Communist Party alumni
Shihezi University alumni
Ministers of Agriculture of the People's Republic of China
People's Republic of China politicians from Beijing
Chinese Communist Party politicians from Beijing
Members of the 15th Central Committee of the Chinese Communist Party